Aïchata Diomande (born July 17, 1984) is an Ivorian female professional basketball player.

References

External links
Profile at afrobasket.com

1984 births
Living people
Sportspeople from Abidjan
Ivorian women's basketball players
Point guards
Shooting guards